The Union Association was a league in Major League Baseball which lasted for just the 1884 season. St. Louis won the pennant and joined the National League the following season. 

Seven of the twelve teams who were in the Association at some point during the season did not play a full schedule: four teams folded during the season and were replaced, while  Chicago moved to Pittsburgh in late August.

History
The league was founded in September 1883 by the young St. Louis millionaire Henry Lucas, who was eventually named the league's president, with owner Tom Pratt of the Philadelphia franchise serving as vice-president and Warren W. White of the Washington franchise as secretary.

After being appointed president, Lucas bought the best available players for his St. Louis franchise at the expense of the rest of the league, which represented an obvious conflict-of-interest situation. Subsequently, the Maroons finished with a record of 94-19 (.832 winning percentage) and won the pennant by 21 games.

The league not only suffered from lopsided talent distribution, but also instability (four franchises folded during the season, forcing the league to scramble to replace them with three teams from lower leagues and one new team, while Chicago moved to Pittsburgh mid-season) and a poorly drafted schedule, which saw the league derisively dubbed "The Onion League" by its detractors in the two established leagues.  The list of franchise movements is as follows:

 April 17: Season opens with the following franchises:  Altoona Mountain Citys, Baltimore Monumentals, Boston Reds, Chicago Browns, Cincinnati Outlaw Reds, Philadelphia Keystones, St. Louis Maroons, and Washington Nationals
 May 31: Altoona Mountain Citys folded.
 June 7: Kansas City Cowboys were formed to take over Altoona's games starting on this date.
 August 7: Philadelphia Keystones folded.
 August 18: Wilmington Quicksteps recruited from Eastern League to take over Philadelphia's games, starting on this date.
 August 21: Chicago Browns played their last game before the franchise moved to Pittsburgh.
 September 15: Wilmington Quicksteps fold, having played their final game on September 12: at this point of the season, the St. Louis Maroons have already clinched the pennant, even though there are still five weeks of games left to play.
 September 18: Pittsburgh Stogies (formerly the Chicago Browns) folded.
 September 27: St. Paul Saints and Milwaukee Brewers were recruited from the Northwest League to finish the Chicago/Pittsburgh and the Philadelphia/Wilmington schedules respectively. 
 October 19: Season concludes.

On January 15, 1885, at a scheduled UA meeting in Milwaukee, only the Milwaukee and Kansas City franchises showed up, and the league was promptly disbanded.

The St. Louis franchise itself was deemed to be strong enough to enter the National League in 1885, but it faced heavy competition within the city, as the St. Louis Browns were a power in the American Association. 

The lone survivor of the Union moved to Indianapolis and became the Hoosiers after 1886, having compiled records of 36-72 and 43-79 in St. Louis, and they played another three seasons before folding, with records of 37-89, 50-85 and 59-75 for a .360 win percentage in the NL, and an all-time franchise winning percentage of .432. These figures perhaps reveal the gulf in class between the UA and the established major leagues.

Perhaps the most obvious impact of the short-lived league was on the career of a player who did not jump to the new league: Charles Radbourn. With a schedule of a little over 100 games, most teams employed two regular pitchers, and the Providence Grays in the National League featured Radbourn and Charlie Sweeney. According to the 1991 book Glory Fades Away by Jerry Lansche, Sweeney fell out of grace with the Providence team in late July after he refused to be replaced in a game while drunk, and was expelled. Rather than come crawling back, Sweeney signed with Lucas' team, leaving Radbourn by himself. 

Leveraging his situation, Radbourn pledged to stay with the club and be the sole primary pitcher if he would be given a raise and granted free agency at season's end. Radbourn, who already had 24 wins at that point to Sweeney's 17, pitched nearly every game after that, and went on to win an astounding 59 games (a record) during the regular season; he has since been credited with another win for 60 that season. For an encore, he also won all three games of 1884's version of the World Series, pitching every inning of a sweep of the New York Metropolitans of the American Association. His performance in 1884, along with a generally strong career and an overall record of 309-194 (.614), assured Radbourn his place in the Baseball Hall of Fame.

Notable players
The best hitter of the 1884 Union Association was Fred Dunlap of the Maroons, while star pitchers for the UA included Jim McCormick, Charlie Sweeney, Dupee Shaw and Hugh Daily.

Notable players that made their debut in the Union Association included Tommy McCarthy, who was elected to the Hall of Fame in 1946, and Jack Clements, the only man in baseball history to play a full career as a left-handed catcher. Switch-pitcher Tony Mullane attempted to sign with the Maroons, but the Browns had a reserve clause on Mullane, and he relented after he was threatened with banishment from the NL if he signed.

Highlights
The Union Association saw two no-hitters in its brief existence: one by Dick Burns of the Outlaw Reds on August 26 and one by Ed Cushman of the Brewers on September 28.  On July 7, Hugh Daily struck out 19 Boston Reds in a nine-inning game, an "MLB" record that would stand for 102 years, until Roger Clemens struck out 20 batters in a game in 1986.  Henry Porter and Dupee Shaw got 18-strikeout games.  The Chicago Browns executed a triple play on June 19.

Standings

Status as a major league
Although the league is conventionally listed as a major league, this status has been questioned by a number of modern baseball historians, most notably Bill James in The New Bill James Historical Baseball Abstract, who found that the contemporary baseball guides did not consider the Union Association to be a major league: the earliest record James found of the Union Association being referred to as a major league was Ernest Lanigan's The Baseball Cyclopedia, published in 1922.

While the league had a number of major league players (on the St. Louis franchise, at least), the league's overall talent and organization was notably inferior to that of the two established major leagues. Of the 272 players in the Association, 107 (39.34%) never played in another major league, while 72 (26.47%) played very briefly (less than 300 at bats and/or 50 hits) in other major leagues, and 79 (29.04%) had longer careers but little success in other major leagues.

The league's only star player, Fred Dunlap, led the league in batting average with .412 (86 points higher than his second-best season, and 120 points higher than his career average), on-base percentage, slugging percentage, runs scored, hits, total bases, and home runs (with 13, typical for the era). After the Association folded, Dunlap never hit higher than .274 or more than seven home runs until he retired in 1891, another measure of the inferior quality of the Union Association. In point of fact, if the 1884 UA season is excluded from his career totals, Dunlap's career batting average was .276 (a drop of sixteen points), and he hit 28 career home runs (losing one-third of his career total).

Further reading
David Pietrusza Major Leagues: The Formation, Sometimes Absorption and Mostly Inevitable Demise of 18 Professional Baseball Organizations, 1871 to Present Jefferson (NC): McFarland & Company, 1991.

References

External links
Union Association at baseball-reference.com.
Union Association - Baseballbiography.com
1884 in baseball at baseballlibrary.com

1884 establishments in the United States
1884 disestablishments in the United States
Defunct major baseball leagues in the United States
Sports leagues established in 1884